In Tamil poetics, thinnais (Tamil: திணை tiṇai "genre", "type") is a type of poetical mode or theme. A thinai consists of a complete poetical landscape - a definite time, place, season in which the poem is set - and background elements characteristic of that landscape - including flora and fauna, inhabitants, deities and social organisation.  These collectively provide imagery for extended poetic metaphors ("ullurai", literally "inner meaning"), which set the mood of the poem.

Classical authors recognised two broad categories of thinais.  Akam thinais (literally, "the inner genre") consisted of modes used in love poetry, associated with specific aspects of a relationship or specific stages in the development of a relationship.  Puram thinais (literally, "the outer genre") consisted of modes that corresponded closely to the akam modes, but were used in heroic, philosophical and moral poetry, to describe the stages of a battle or particular patterns of thought.  Later commentators added further categories, such as akappuram, which consisted of modes that mixed elements of akam and puram poetry, and purappuram, which consisted of modes used for peripheral puram themes. The five tinais were kurinji (hilly/mountain region), palai (  parched/dry lands), mullai (pastoral tract), marutam (wet/ agricultural lands) and neital (coastal area). Recent literary studies on Tinai gave birth to Tinai Poetics, the native Indian theory similar to ecocriticism, which is based on the Tinai concept of Classical Tamil Literature.

See also
 Sangam Literature
 Sangam

References

Sources 

 

Tamil poetics